The 1994 California State Senate elections were held on  November 8, 1994. Senate seats of even-numbered districts were up for election. Senate terms are staggered so that half the membership is elected every two years. Senators serve four-year terms and are limited to two terms. The Democrats lost two seats to the Republicans, but maintained a majority in the Senate.

Overview

Results
Final results from the California Secretary of State:

District 2

District 4

District 6

District 8

District 10

District 12

District 14

District 16

District 18

District 20

District 22

District 24

District 26

District 28

District 30

District 32

District 34

District 36

District 38

District 40

See also
California State Assembly
California State Assembly elections, 1994
California state elections, 1994
California State Legislature
California State Senate Districts
Districts in California
Political party strength in U.S. states

References

Senate
California
1994